Iranaipalai [Tamil: இரணைப்பாலை] is a village in Mullaitivu District, Sri Lanka.

References 

Towns in Mullaitivu District
Puthukkudiyiruppu DS Division